Terryville may refer to:
 Terryville, Connecticut
 Terryville, Kentucky
 Terryville, New York
 Terryville, Texas